, also written as (120132) 2003 FY128, is a trans-Neptunian object with a diameter of about 460 km. It orbits the Sun at a distance of about 49.81 astronomical units. It was discovered on 26 March 2003 by the NEAT program at the Palomar Observatory, California.

Classification
It is classified as a detached object by the Deep Ecliptic Survey (DES), since its orbit appears to be beyond the current control of Neptune. Though, if Neptune migrated outward, there would have been a period when Neptune had a higher eccentricity.

References

External links 
 (120132) 2003 FY128 Precovery Images
 

Scattered disc and detached objects
Discoveries by NEAT
Possible dwarf planets
20030326